Influenza is a disease commonly called the flu.

It may also refer to:

Disease

Flu
 Influenzavirus, the viruses that cause influenza disease
 Influenza epidemic, "the influenza" mass disease for a given region in a given year
 Influenza pandemic, "the influenza" global mass disease for a given year
 Seasonal influenza, "the influenza" for a given year
 1918 influenza pandemic

Other
 Influenza-like illness, illness that resembles, mistaken for, called influenza
 Intestinal influenza (stomach flu), gastroenteritis not necessarily related to influenza
 Parainfluenza

Songs
 Influenza (2000 song), a song by Kruder & Dorfmeister
 Influenza (1997 song), a B-side by Tanya Donelly off the album Lovesongs for Underdogs
 Influenza (1983 song), a song by Gene Loves Jezebel off the album Promise (Gene Loves Jezebel album)
 Influenza (1982 song), a song by Todd Rundgren off the album The Ever Popular Tortured Artist Effect

Other uses
 Haemophilus influenzae (H. influenzae) a bacterium mistakenly thought to cause influenza
 PLOS Currents: Influenza (2009–13), a defunct research journal
 Influenza: The Musical (Even Stevens), a 2002 episode of Even Stevens

See also

Haemophilus influenzae
 Influenza and Other Respiratory Viruses, a research journal
 
 
 Flu (disambiguation)
 Grippe (disambiguation)
 Influence (disambiguation)